Keenan Palasia (born 24 January 1997) is a Samoa international rugby league footballer who plays as a  and er for the Brisbane Broncos in the NRL.

Background
Palasia was born in the Logan area of Brisbane, Queensland, Australia & raised on the Gold Coast, Queensland, Australia. 

He is of Maori & Samoan descent, his mother being Maori from Waitara, New Zealand (Iwi: Te Āti Awa) & his father is Christchurch born Samoan from the Leutele family of Falefa & Malie in Samoa.  

Palasia is also the eldest nephew of former NRL player and Cronulla Sharks 2016 premiership winning centre, Ricky Leutele (the youngest brother of Keenan's father) who now plays in the English Superleague for Huddersfield Giants. Palasia has a younger brother, Saiah who was born in 2001 on the Gold Coast. 

Keenan was born in Logan, Brisbane but he & his family moved to the Gold Coast in 1997 when he was just 2 weeks old & he was raised on the Gold Coast for over 17 years until he graduated from Palm Beach-Currumbin High School in 2014 then moved to Brisbane to commence his 1st preseason with Brisbane Broncos Under 20s.

He played his 1st rugby league game at age 10 for Parkwood Sharks Junior Rugby League club on the Gold Coast where he was later joined by close friend & primary school class mate Briton Nikora. Palasia then later played his teenage years for Nerang Roosters Junior Rugby League.

Keenan played schoolboy Rugby League for Palm Beach-Currumbin High School (PBC) from 2010-2014 and was also a part of the 2014 PBC Reds team playing 2nd Row in the GIO Cup Open Schoolboys Qld final winning against Wavell High School alongside Keegan Hipgrave & Jed Cartwright

Early career
In 2012, Palasia who was in the Gold Coast Titans development system since age 13, played in the under-16s Gold Coast Titans Cyril Connell Cup side as a 15-year-old. In 2012, he represented the Queensland under-15 Schoolboys rugby league team alongside Jaydn Su'A & Keegan Hipgrave in Darwin. Also in 2012, he represented the Qld Samoa under-16 rugby league team as a 15 year old in the annual Qld Pacific Island Cultural Rugby League game winning against Qld Maori alongside George Fai & JJ Collins. In 2013, he captained the under-16 Gold Coast Green rugby league team in the Cyril Connell Cup competition. That same year, he was a part of the Queensland Academy of Sport (QAS) Rugby League team which toured New Zealand and won both games against New Zealand residents playing second row.

Also in 2013, Palasia represented Qld Samoa under-16 Rugby League team in the annual Qld Pacific Island Cultural Rugby League Carnival winning the competition alongside Jaydn Su'A & Phillip Sami. In November 2013, Palasia formally signed with the Brisbane Broncos as a 16 year old. In 2014, he played for Gold Coast White under-18 team as a 17 year old in the Mal Meninga Cup competition. Also in 2014, Palasia represented the Queensland under-18 Open Schoolboys rugby league team as a 17 year old. In 2015, Palasia represented the Queensland 18yrs State of Origin rugby league team, under coach Anthony Seibold, in Melbourne at the State of Origin opener at the MCG winning against NSW alongside Keegan Hipgrave, Jaydn Su'a & Gehamat Shibasaki. In 2017, Keenan represented the Queensland under-20 rugby league team under coach Justin Hodges at Suncorp Stadium alongside Brodie Croft, Phillip Sami & AJ Brimson whilst also working in the NRL office under ex-Kangaroos and QLD Origin player David Shillington for the NRL State of Mind initiative co-ordinating awareness presentations to local junior rugby league clubs. In 2019, Palasia represented the Queensland Residents rugby league team in second row winning against NSW at Dolphin Stadium, Redcliffe alongside fellow ISC  Wynnum Manly Seagulls team mates Mitch Cronin, Delouise Hoeter, Richie Kennar & Sam Scarlett.

Playing career
On 7 July 2019 Palasia made his NRL debut for the Broncos against the Cronulla-Sutherland Sharks. After a journey to the 2019 Intrust Super Cup grand final, Palasia sustained an ACL tear during 2019/2020 preseason and underwent his 3rd knee reconstruction, sidelining him for the entire 2020 season. This was his 5th surgery since age 17 (hand, ankle & 3 knee surgeries). In Round 11 2021, Palasia scored his first NRL try in his first game in two seasons in a 34-16 win over the Sydney Roosters. Historically a second rower with the added footwork of a back & ability to ball play throughout his career due to also playing touch football at representative levels as a youngster, Palasia has shown versatility by recently being moved into the middle in the prop & lock positions which has been a successful transition. On 1 December 2022, Palasia signed a two-year deal to join the Gold Coast starting in 2024.

References

External links
Brisbane Broncos profile

1997 births
Australian rugby league players
New Zealand Māori rugby league players
Australian people of Māori descent
Australian sportspeople of Samoan descent
 Australian people of New Zealand descent
Brisbane Broncos players
Rugby league second-rows
Wynnum Manly Seagulls players
Living people
Rugby league players from Brisbane